The Antoinette IV was an early French monoplane.

Design and development
The Antoinette IV was a high-wing aircraft with a fuselage of extremely narrow triangular cross-section and a cruciform tail. Power was provided by a V8 engine of Léon Levavasseur's own design driving a paddle-bladed tractor propeller. Lateral control was at first effected with large triangular, and shortly afterwards trapezoidal-planform  ailerons hinged to the trailing edge of the wings, although wing-warping was substituted at an early stage in flight trials, and in this type proved more effective.
 
On 19 February 1909, the Antoinette IV flew  at Mourmelon-le-Grand, and on 19 July, Hubert Latham attempted to cross the English Channel in it, covering  out of Sangatte before making a forced water landing due to engine failure.

On 3 October 1910, Frenchman René Thomas, flying the Antoinette IV, collided with British Army Captain Bertram Dickson by ramming his Farman III biplane in the rear. Both pilots survived, but Dickson was so badly injured that he never flew again.

Specifications

See also 

 Gastambide-Mengin monoplane
 Antoinette III
 Antoinette V
 Antoinette VI
 Antoinette VII
 Antoinette military monoplane
 Fedor Ivanovich Bylinkin, designer of a similar aircraft, 1910

References

 
 World Aircraft Information Files. Brightstar Publishing: London. File 889 Sheet 63.
 Hubert Latham: Windkiller
 Hubert Latham
 "Antoinette VII un avión con historia" by Eloy Martin, 2013 (in Spanish).

1900s French experimental aircraft
4
Single-engined tractor aircraft
High-wing aircraft
Aircraft first flown in 1908